Pat Hawkins (born ) is a former US national champion sprinter and hurdler, and the former American record holder in the women's 200-meter hurdles.

Athletics
Hawkins represented Brooklyn's Atoms Track Club, founded by Fred Thompson, later an assistant coach for the 1988 US Olympic track and field team.

Hawkins was a four-time US national champion in the women's 200-meter hurdles from 1969 to 1972. In 1971, she set an American record in the 200-meter hurdles, improving upon her existing American record with a time of 26.1 seconds. She won a silver medal in the 100 meter dash at the 1971 USA Outdoor Track and Field Championships and a bronze medal at the 1972 USA Outdoor Track and Field Championships in the 200-meter hurdles.

She won the US National Indoor Championship 60-meter dash in 1971.

She was a member of the 1971 Pan American Games gold-medal-winning 4x100-meter relay team.

Awards
She won the women's track and field AAU prize in 1970.

References

Further reading
Collegiate championship results

Living people
1950s births
Place of birth missing (living people)
American female hurdlers
World Athletics Championships athletes for the United States
Athletes (track and field) at the 1971 Pan American Games
USA Outdoor Track and Field Championships winners
USA Indoor Track and Field Championships winners
Pan American Games medalists in athletics (track and field)
Pan American Games gold medalists for the United States
Medalists at the 1971 Pan American Games
21st-century American women